The 2022 Nova Scotia Liberal Party leadership election took place on July 9, 2022 to elect a leader to replace Iain Rankin, who announced his intent to resign on January 5, 2022 after leading the party since 2021 and following the party's defeat in the 2021 Nova Scotia general election.

Background
Iain Rankin announced that he would be resigning as leader on January 6, 2022, following the party's defeat in the 2021 general election and after consulting with his family. Rankin remained Leader of the Opposition and leader of the Nova Scotia Liberal Party until a successor was chosen.

Timeline

2022
January 5 – Iain Rankin announces his resignation as leader of the Nova Scotia Liberal Party.
January 30 – The party unveils the base set of rules for the election.
February 4 – Angela Simmonds declares her candidacy.
February 14 – The official rules for the leadership election will be released.
February 19 – Zach Churchill declares his candidacy.
March 4–5 – Liberal Party Annual General Meeting is held.
March 5 – A new Nova Scotia Liberal Party board is elected.
March 21 – Last day to register as a candidate.
July 9 – Leadership convention is held.

Candidates

Declared

Zach Churchill
 
Zach Churchill is the MLA for Yarmouth, having served since 2010. In the McNeil and Rankin governments, he served as Minister of Health and Wellness, Natural Resources, Municipal Affairs, Communications Nova Scotia, and Education and Early Childhood Development. Prior to announcing his candidacy, Churchill served as Deputy Leader of the Opposition as well as the critic for Health and Wellness and Health Care Professionals Recruitment.

Candidacy announced: February 19, 2022
Campaign website:

Angela Simmonds

Angela Simmonds is the MLA for Preston, having served since 2021. Prior to announcing her candidacy, Simmonds has been serving as Deputy Speaker of the Nova Scotia House of Assembly and Opposition critic for Justice, Office of Equity and Anti-Racism Initiatives, Human Rights Commission and Accessibility Act.

Candidacy announced: February 4, 2022
Campaign website:

Declined
Patricia Arab, MLA for Fairview-Clayton Park (2013-); former Minister of Service Nova Scotia and Internal Services, and Communications Nova Scotia. (Endorsed Churchill)
Ali Duale, MLA for Halifax Armdale (2021-) (Endorsed Simmonds)
Tony Ince, MLA for Cole Harbour (2013-); former Minister of African Nova Scotian Affairs, Communications Nova Scotia, Communities, Culture and Heritage, and the Public Service Commission. (Endorsed Churchill)
Brendan Maguire, MLA for Halifax Atlantic (2013-); former Minister of Municipal Affairs. (Endorsed Simmonds)
Kelly Regan, MLA for Bedford Basin (2009-); former Deputy Premier; former Minister of Community Services, Seniors, and Labour and Advanced Education.
Fred Tilley, MLA for Northside-Westmount (2021-). (Endorsed Simmonds)

Debates

Results
 = Winner

See also 

 Next Nova Scotia general election
 2021 Nova Scotia Liberal Party leadership election
 2022 Nova Scotia New Democratic Party leadership election

References

Liberal
2022 elections in Canada
2022 political party leadership elections
Liberal Party leadership election